Symmocoides gozmanyi is a moth of the family Autostichidae. It is found in Portugal.

References

Moths described in 1959
Symmocoides